1503 Kuopio, provisional designation , is a stony Eunomian asteroid from the central region of the asteroid belt, approximately 19 kilometers in diameter. It was discovered on 15 December 1938, by astronomer Yrjö Väisälä at the Turku Observatory in Southwest Finland. The asteroid was named for the Finnish town of Kuopio.

Orbit and classification 

Kuopio is a member of the Eunomia family, a prominent family of stony S-type asteroid and the largest one in the intermediate main belt with more than 5,000 members. It orbits the Sun at a distance of 2.3–2.9 AU once every 4 years and 3 months (1,553 days). Its orbit has an eccentricity of 0.10 and an inclination of 12° with respect to the ecliptic.

Physical characteristics

Rotation period 

Several rotational lightcurves of Kuopio were obtained from photometric observations since 2001. Analysis of these lightcurves gave a rotation period between 9.577 and 9.98 hours with a brightness variation of 0.01 to 0.05 magnitude.

Poles 

In 2011 and 2013, a modeled lightcurve using data from the Uppsala Asteroid Photometric Catalogue (UAPC) and other sources was published. In both studies, the modeled lightcurve gave a concurring period 9.9586 hours. The 2013-publication also determined two spin axis of (170.0°, −86.0°) and (27.0°, −61.0°) in ecliptic coordinates (λ, β).

Diameter and albedo 

According to the surveys carried out by the Infrared Astronomical Satellite IRAS, the Japanese Akari satellite and the NEOWISE mission of NASA's Wide-field Infrared Survey Explorer, Kuopio measures between 18.43 and 22.99 kilometers in diameter  and its surface has an albedo between 0.223 and 0.399.

The Collaborative Asteroid Lightcurve Link derives an albedo of 0.3243 and a diameter of 18.54 kilometers based on an absolute magnitude of 10.5.

Naming 

This minor planet was named after the town of Kuopio in central Finland. The official  was published by the Minor Planet Center on 20 February 1976.

References

External links 
 Asteroid Lightcurve Database (LCDB), query form (info )
 Dictionary of Minor Planet Names, Google books
 Asteroids and comets rotation curves, CdR – Observatoire de Genève, Raoul Behrend
 Discovery Circumstances: Numbered Minor Planets (1)-(5000) – Minor Planet Center
 
 

001503
Discoveries by Yrjö Väisälä
Named minor planets
19381215